Tumul is a rural locality (a selo), the only inhabited locality, and the administrative center of Modutsky Rural Okrug of Namsky District in the Sakha Republic, Russia, located  from Namtsy, the administrative center of the district. Its population as of the 2010 Census was 986, of whom 487 were male and 499 female, up from 859 as recorded during the 2002 Census.

References

Inline citations

Sources
Official website of the Sakha Republic. Registry of the Administrative-Territorial Divisions of the Sakha Republic. Namsky District. 

Rural localities in Namsky District
Populated places on the Lena River